Amy Lynne Seimetz is an American actress and filmmaker. She has appeared in several productions, including AMC's The Killing, HBO's Family Tree, and films like Upstream Color, Alien: Covenant, Pet Sematary, and No Sudden Move.

In addition to her acting career, she has directed, written and produced several films, including 2012's Sun Don't Shine and 2020's She Dies Tomorrow. In 2015, she co-wrote, co-directed and executive produced the Starz series The Girlfriend Experience, based on the Steven Soderbergh film of the same name, which was released to positive reviews and critical acclaim.

Early life and education
Seimetz grew up in the Tampa-St. Petersburg area, and briefly attended film school at the Florida State University before moving to Los Angeles. There, she worked as a nanny, a waitress, and a seamstress while learning filmmaking.

Career
Seimetz began her film career by producing and directing short and independent films, including Barry Jenkins' Medicine for Melancholy, which was nominated for Gotham and Independent Spirit Awards after playing at South By Southwest and the Toronto International Film Festival. She acted in Joe Swanberg's Alexander The Last, which premiered at SXSW. She also worked with Swanberg on Silver Bullets and Autoerotic, continuing with acting roles in Gabi on the Roof in July, Tiny Furniture, Open Five, and The Myth of the American Sleepover.

Seimetz's performance in A Horrible Way to Die won her the Best Actress award at Fantastic Fest. The film premiered at the Toronto International Film Festival to good reviews. She appeared in The Off Hours. About her, the Los Angeles Times wrote: "Every year, the Sundance Film Festival has a semi-official 'it girl' who encapsulates the festival's cocktail of discovery and buzz. But what about someone who embodies the independent film world's sense of community and the pitch-in spirit of collaboration, something like a most valuable player? That prize might well go to Amy Seimetz."

The Hollywood Reporter singled Seimetz out as one of the breakouts of Sundance that year: "As a late-night truck-stop waitress and orphaned lost soul, Seimetz invests Off Hours' dead-end world of tiny tragedies with a hidden, hard-won strength." She appeared in Revenge for Jolly!. In 2012, she made her feature directorial debut with the Florida-based thriller Sun Don't Shine, which she also wrote, produced, and co-edited. The film premiered at South By Southwest to rave reviews. Indiewire wrote: "Her terrific directorial debut was a brilliant noir exercise with less mumbling than raw brawls. She pinned me to my Alamo Drafthouse seat and the film kept me there for the next 82 minutes."

Seimetz is the star of Upstream Color and Pit Stop, both of which premiered at the 2013 Sundance Film Festival. In February, she was added as a series regular to AMC's series The Killing. In season 3, she plays Danette Leeds, a "hard-living, financially strapped single mother whose 14-year-old daughter goes missing".

In June 2014, Starz announced that they had ordered a 13-episode anthology series of the film The Girlfriend Experience, co-written, co-directed, and executive produced by Seimetz and Lodge Kerrigan. This came after the film's creator Steven Soderbergh stated: "I think if I were going to run a studio I'd just be gathering the best filmmakers I could find and sort of let them do their thing within certain economic parameters. So I would call Shane Carruth, or Barry Jenkins or Amy Seimetz and I'd bring them in and go, OK, what do you want to do?" The series was later renewed for a second season, and Seimetz continued to produce, write, and direct episodes.

In 2017, Seimetz appeared in Alien: Covenant, directed by Ridley Scott, and also had roles in Lean on Pete, directed by Andrew Haigh, and My Days of Mercy, opposite Elliot Page. In 2018, Seimetz starred opposite Molly Shannon in Wild Nights with Emily directed by Madeleine Olnek. That same year, Seimetz directed two episodes of Atlanta, and had a recurring role on the second season of Get Shorty.

In 2019, Seimetz starred in Pet Sematary, an adaption of the novel of the same name by Stephen King. She directed She Dies Tomorrow, starring Kate Lyn Sheil and Jane Adams, which was set to have its world premiere at South by Southwest in March 2020, but was cancelled due to the COVID-19 pandemic.

Seimetz co-starred in 2020's The Comey Rule, a miniseries for Showtime, and the thriller film The Secrets We Keep directed by Yuval Alder.

Personal life

In 2016, Seimetz was engaged to filmmaker Shane Carruth, though they had separated by 2019. She later obtained a temporary restraining order against him, alleging years of emotional, mental, and physical abuse. In 2020, Seimetz was granted a restraining order against Carruth that will expire in August 2025.

Filmography

Film

Television

Awards and nominations

Notes 
 Shared with Claire Sloma, Marlon Morton, Amanda Bauer, Brett Jacobsen, Nikita Ramsey, and Jade Ramsey
 Shared with Brady Corbet, and David Oyelowo.

References

External links 
 

Living people
American film actresses
American film directors
American documentary filmmakers
Date of birth missing (living people)
American women screenwriters
21st-century American actresses
Actresses from Tampa, Florida
Filmmakers from Florida
Screenwriters from Florida
American women documentary filmmakers
21st-century American screenwriters
21st-century American women writers
Year of birth missing (living people)
Film directors from Florida
Film producers from Florida
American women film editors
American film editors
American women television directors
American television directors
American women television writers
American women television producers